Ain Kalmus (given name Evald Mänd; 8 June 1906 Emmaste Parish, Hiiu County – 15 November 2001) was an Estonian writer and theologian.

From 1925 to 1929, he studied at the Baptist Evangelical Seminary at Keila. After that he finished Andover Newton Theological School (in the United States), defending his master's thesis. After returning from the United States, he worked as a Baptist minister in Tartu and Southern Estonia, later also as a pastor in Tallinn. In 1944, he and his family escaped to Sweden and in 1946, to the United States.

Works
 1942: Soolased tuuled (Salty Winds), novel 
 1945: Öö tuli liiga vara (Night Came Too Early), novel
 1948: Hingemaa (Land of Spirits), novel
 1950: Prohvet (Prophet, or The Unfaithful), novel
 1969: Juudas (Judas), novel

References

1906 births
2001 deaths
Estonian male writers
20th-century Estonian writers
Estonian theologians
20th-century Baptist ministers
People from Hiiumaa Parish
Estonian World War II refugees
Estonian emigrants to the United States